Viona Rexhepi (born 24 July 1996) is a Kosovan-born Albanian footballer who plays as a goalkeeper and has appeared for the Albania women's national team.

Career
Rexhepi has been capped for the Albania national team, appearing for the team during the 2019 FIFA Women's World Cup qualifying cycle.

See also
List of Albania women's international footballers

References

External links
 
 
 

1996 births
Living people
Albanian women's footballers
Women's association football goalkeepers
Albania women's international footballers
Sportspeople from Pristina
Kosovan women's footballers
KFF Mitrovica players
Kosovan people of Albanian descent
Sportspeople of Albanian descent